Glycomyces sambucus is a bacterium from the genus of Glycomyces which has been isolated from the stem of the tree Sambucus adnata from Xishuangbanna in China.

References 

Actinomycetia
Bacteria described in 2007